Katherine Beth Nolan is an American sports television host known as Katie Nolan, most recently serving as a commentator for Apple TV+'s Friday Night Baseball and recently created short-form content at NBC Sports. She formerly hosted a weekly ESPN podcast called Sports? With Katie Nolan, Always Late with Katie Nolan on ESPN2, and Garbage Time with Katie Nolan on Fox Sports. She won a Sports Emmy Award in 2016 for Garbage Time and was nominated for another in 2019 and 2020 for Always Late.

Early life 
Nolan was raised in Framingham, Massachusetts. In 1997, at age 10, Nolan won the gold medal in rhythmic gymnastics at the Junior Olympics. She graduated from Framingham High School in 2005, and earned a Bachelor of Arts in Public Relations with a minor in Dance from Hofstra University in 2009.

Career 
In 2011, while bartending in Boston at the White Horse Tavern, Nolan started a blog called Bitches Can't Hang, which focused on pop culture and news. At that time, Nolan also began working with Guyism, part of the Fox Sports Yardbarker network, where she produced and hosted the YouTube series Guyism Speed Round. In her videos, she delivered a monologue of comedic and sarcastic one-liners in the style of Saturday Night Lives Weekend Update. In an interview with GQ in 2018, Nolan expressed regret for how Bitches Can't Hang and her "being mean about women" jump-started her career.

Fox Sports 
In August 2013, Nolan joined Fox Sports 1 as a digital correspondent for Crowd Goes Wild, a sports/entertainment talk show hosted by Regis Philbin. 
Nolan also hosted the FoxSports.com web series No Filter with Katie Nolan. A September 2014 video featuring commentary on the Ray Rice domestic violence incident was picked up by The New York Times and received praise in multiple media outlets. Nolan appeared as a panelist on a January 2015 episode of The Nightly Show with Larry Wilmore.

Nolan was formerly the host of the weekly Fox Sports 1 show Garbage Time with Katie Nolan, which premiered on March 15, 2015. Deadspin praised Nolan's April 12, 2015, piece, criticizing the blog posting called "How to land a husband at the Masters", which appeared on a fellow Fox reporter's blog. Garbage Time won a Sports Emmy for 'Outstanding Social TV Experience' on May 10, 2016.

In September 2016, Nolan began hosting NFL Films Presents, airing on Fox Sports 1. NFL and Fox Sports 1 made a joint decision to choose Nolan as the new host.

On February 23, 2017, it was announced that Garbage Time would either be retooled from its current format, or Fox Sports would find a new hosting vehicle for Nolan. After seven months without a show, Nolan left Fox Sports in September 2017.

ESPN 
On October 4, 2017, ESPN announced the hiring of Nolan, who will appear across ESPN studio programming and have a digital presence. She made her debut as a guest panelist on ESPN's Highly Questionable on October 19, 2017; she has since guest-hosted that show several times, and appeared on the sister radio show The Dan Le Batard Show with Stugotz. She has said she likes going on Highly Questionable.

In early November 2017, it was announced that Nolan would be doing a podcast with ESPN beginning in January in addition to a digital show later. In November, she began as one of the hosts of SportsCenter on Snapchat.

In 2018, Nolan began hosting a weekly ESPN podcast, Sports? with Katie Nolan and in 2020 was shifted into a biweekly show. In September 2018, her ESPN+ series Always Late with Katie Nolan launched; a 'best of the year' episode aired on the main ABC network on December 30, 2018. In 2019, the show moved to ESPN2 and the ESPN app, with Nolan citing that she and her staff could post more show clips to social media, as being confined to ESPN+ restricted the amount of the program which could be posted to free venues.

Always Late was canceled in 2020. On September 29, 2021, Nolan announced her departure from ESPN.

Other work
In December 2015, Nolan teamed up with United Airlines for a new web-based series of videos titled "Big Metal Bird", which explains some of the inner workings of various facets of United Airlines. The premiere episode debuted on December 15, 2015 and explained how United's baggage handling system operates. Future episodes are intended to address customer feedback that United has received.

Nolan has appeared in three episodes of the Comedy Central program Drunk History. On October 18, 2016, she narrated the story of Theodore Roosevelt's campaign for rule changes in football due to the violence of the game in the early 1900s. On February 13, 2018, she narrated the story of feminist icon Gloria Steinem. On January 30, 2019, she talked about the Black Sox Scandal involving the fixing of the 1919 World Series.

Nolan is also the former Guinness World Record holder for most donuts stacked in a tower while blindfolded (seven), doing so on the November 7, 2018 episode of Always Late.

She joined NBC Olympics in time for the 2022 Winter Olympics, which began on February 3, 2022.

Nolan joined the broadcast team for Apple TV's Friday Night Baseball starting in April 2022 in a one season experiment.

References

External links
 
 Garbage Time with Katie Nolan Website
 

1987 births
21st-century American journalists
21st-century American women
American bloggers
American Internet celebrities
American podcasters
American sports journalists
American television hosts
American television talk show hosts
American women comedians
American women podcasters
American women television presenters
ESPN people
Fox Sports 1 people
Framingham High School alumni
Hofstra University alumni
The Lawrence Herbert School of Communication alumni
Late night television talk show hosts
Liberalism in the United States
Living people
Major League Baseball broadcasters
NFL Films people
People from Boston
People from Framingham, Massachusetts
Women sports commentators